The Partisans is a 1979 aluminum sculpture by the Polish-American sculptor Andrzej Pitynski that has been exhibited in Boston, Massachusetts, since 1983. The sculpture depicts Polish anti-communist "cursed soldiers". It is dedicated to freedom fighters worldwide.

Description
This modern aluminum sculpture depicts five riders and their horses. The horsemen carry spears on their back, and with their bowed heads the sculpture intends to convey the themes of crucifixion and sacrifice. According to its creator they are intended to represent:

Five armed riders in a marching formation; five desperate men who resemble forest ghosts more than they resemble human beings ... five partisans who are tattered, mortally tired, who are bleeding from endless battles, escapes, skirmishes ... immersed with their own thoughts about the tragedy of their nation, who are riding their horses, stumbling from exhaustion.

The sculpture is a symbolic representation of the cursed soldiers – anti-communist Polish partisans who fought against the Polish communist regime following the communist takeover of Poland in the aftermath of World War II (and not, as some sources erroneously suggest, World War II era anti-Nazi Polish partisans). The sculptor however dedicated his work to "all freedom fighters around the world".

History
Pitynski designed the sculpture in 1979 for the Johnson Atelier – The Technical Institute of Sculpture, with financial support from the Sculpture Foundation. The sculpture was met with a degree of controversy, and Pitynski received threats from the sympathizers of the communist People's Republic of Poland.

The sculpture has been displayed in Boston since 1983. At first it was given to the city for temporary display, but it has since become a permanent monument. Until January 2006, the statue was located on Boston Common, near the corner of Charles and Beacon streets. City officials cited concerns that the statue lacked a proper pedestal and stored it in a warehouse, which triggered protests from the Polish-American community and from the sculptor himself. In July of that year, the statue was moved to a new public location, thanks to assistance from the Massachusetts Bay Transportation Authority (MBTA). It was located on the South Boston waterfront near the Boston Institute of Contemporary Art and the MBTA's World Trade Center Station on the Silver Line. The statue was rededicated in the presence of the area's Polish American community and of local officials, a gesture endorsed both by Pitynski and by the Polish Consulate in Boston. On November 17, 2018, the statue was permanently relocated to the center median of D Street, at the intersection with Congress Street.

References

1983 sculptures
Aluminum sculptures in Massachusetts
Outdoor sculptures in Boston
Monuments and memorials in Boston
Boston Common
Horses in art

Polish-American culture in Massachusetts
1983 establishments in Massachusetts